The 1948 AAFC season 49ers began their third season in the AAFC, hoping to improve upon their 8–4–2 output from the previous season. They began the season 10–0, and finished 12–2, both losses coming to eventual season champions, the Cleveland Browns. 

The 49ers' offense was historically prolific: they scored 495 points in 1948 (averaging over 35 points per game), which was more than 100 points more than the next best output (389 points by the Browns). Despite their 12–2 record, the 49ers did not qualify for the playoffs, due to the Browns 14–0 record.

The 1948 49ers had a record-setting rushing attack: the team rushed for a staggering 3,653 yards in only fourteen games, a professional football record that still stands.

The team's statistical leaders included Frankie Albert with 1,990 passing yards, Johnny Strzykalski with 915 rushing yards, and Alyn Beals with 591 receiving yards and 84 points scored.

Schedule

Game summaries

Week 13

Standings

References

San Francisco
San Francisco 49ers seasons
1948 in sports in California